The Chittagong Stock Exchange is a stock exchange based in the port city Chittagong, Bangladesh. It is one of the twin financial hubs of the country, alongside the Dhaka Stock Exchange. Established in 1995, the exchange is located in the Agrabad business district in downtown Chittagong. It has a combined market capitalization of over US$ 38 billion as of 2020.

Timeline

1 April 1995 CSE incorporated as a company.
10 October Floor trading started in cry out system.
4 November 1995 formally opened by then former Prime Minister Begum Khaleda Zia.
30 May 2004 Internet based Trading system opened.
8 July 2015 CSE launched new brand logo.

Trading hours

Market opens at 09:30 am local time.

Market closes at 01:50 pm local time.

2010-11 crash

The bullish market turned bearish during 2010, with the exchange losing 1,800 points between December 2010 and January 2011. Millions of investors have been rendered bankrupt as a result of the market crash. The crash is believed to be caused artificially to benefit a handful of players at the expense of the big players.

See also

 Chittagong Tea Auction
 List of South Asian stock exchanges
 List of stock exchanges in the Commonwealth of Nations

References

External links

 
 Bangladeshstockmarket
 

Companies based in Chittagong
Agrabad
 
Chittagong
Economy of Chittagong
Financial services companies established in 1995
1995 establishments in Bangladesh
Finance in Bangladesh